are traditional Japanese screens or blinds, made of horizontal slats of decorative wood, bamboo, or other natural material, woven together with simple string, colored yarn, or other decorative material to make nearly solid blinds  can be either rolled or folded up out of the way. They are also sometimes called , particularly if they have a green fabric hem. , non-hanging , are made of vertical slats of common reed and used as screen.

 are used in many Japanese homes to shield the verandah and other openings of the building from sunlight, rain, and insects. They are normally put up in spring and taken down again in autumn. Their light structure allows breezes to pass through, a benefit in the hot Japanese summers. Since the building materials are easy to find,  can be made cheaply.

Elaborate  for palaces and villas used high-quality bamboo, with expensive silk and gold embroidery worked in. Sometimes they featured paintings, most often on the inside; some Chinese screens had symbols painted on the outside as well.

Social role

 protect the inhabitants of the building not only from the elements, but also from the eyes of outsiders. They are featured prominently in The Tale of Genji.  

During the Heian period (794–1185), a court lady would conceal herself behind a screen when speaking with a man outside her immediate family. She could peep through it and see her interlocutor, but because he had to remain at a distance from it, he could not see her. Only with her permission might he step closer and only she would ever raise the screen. Any unwarranted moves on the man's part were seen as a grave breach of etiquette and a threat against the lady's honour.  

 were also used in imperial audiences. This practice fell out of use as imperial power declined.

Modern production
Following the Edo period (1603–1867) and in the ensuing Meiji period (1868–1911), the production of  went into decline and became a traditional handicraft, but they still are sold and shipped abroad by various companies. These  are typically woven on looms.

Museum

Gallery

See also

References

External links 

 Sudare museum 
 Edo Sudare 
 Hirata Sudare:Long-established store in Kyoto 
 Interview with Sudare craftsman, Otoji Kawasaki of Kyoto 

Japanese architectural features
Japanese home
Japanese bamboowork
Japanese words and phrases
Partitions in traditional Japanese architecture